The men's discus throw event at the 1967 Summer Universiade was held at the National Olympic Stadium in Tokyo on 31 August 1967.

Results

References

Athletics at the 1967 Summer Universiade
1967